Edward Szturm de Sztrem (18 July 1885 in Saint Petersburg – 9 September 1962 in Warsaw) was a Polish statistician and demographer. From 1929 till the German invasion of Poland in 1939 he was the director of the Polish Central Statistical Office, succeeding Józef Buzek. In 1937 he became the president of the newly founded Polish Statistical Society. He was a lecturer in the Wolna Wszechnica Polska before the war, and after the war, in the Main School of Planning and Statistics.

Publications
Kształtowanie się cen na ważniejsze artykuły rolne w Polsce, 1927
Atlas statystyczny Polski, 1941
Elementy demografii, 1956

References
 Leinwand Artur, Tadeusz Szturm de Sztrem. PWN, Warszawa 1987

1885 births
1962 deaths
Scientists from Warsaw
People from the Russian Empire of Polish descent
Polish demographers
Polish statisticians
Academic staff of the SGH Warsaw School of Economics
Peter the Great St. Petersburg Polytechnic University alumni
Recipients of the Order of Polonia Restituta
Burials at Powązki Cemetery